Progress M-12M, identified by NASA as Progress 44P, was an uncrewed Progress spacecraft that was lost in a launch failure on 24 August 2011, at the start of a mission to resupply the International Space Station. It was the twelfth modernised Progress-M spacecraft to be launched. Manufactured by RKK Energia, the spacecraft was to have been operated by the Russian Federal Space Agency.

Planned mission

Progress M-12M's planned mission had included resupplying ISS with 2670 kg of supplies, including oxygen, food and fuel. The planned mission also included three reboosts to the ISS.

Progress M-12M was due to dock with the aft port of the Zvezda module of the International Space Station at around 14:40 UTC on 26 August 2011, just over two days after launch. It would have remained docked for six months, before undocking on 5 March 2012.

Cargo
Progress M-12M was carrying  of cargo to the International Space Station. Of the fuel,  would have been used to refuel the ISS, and the remaining 250 kilograms would have been expended by the Progress spacecraft whilst docked, in its three reboost manoeuvres.

The spacecraft also contained  of dry cargo, which consisted of parts for the station's air, water, power, lighting and thermal regulation systems, its control panels, and power supply system. The spacecraft would also have delivered  of personal supplies for the crew, including letters, parcels and cameras. Of this,  was for the entire crew, and the remaining  was for the Russian crewmembers only.

A further  of the cargo consisted of twelve scientific experiments to be performed aboard the station.

Launch failure
Progress M-12M was launched by a Soyuz-U carrier rocket, flying from Area 1/5 of the Baikonur Cosmodrome. Liftoff occurred at 13:00:11 UTC on 24 August 2011.

Approximately 325 seconds into flight, a malfunction was detected in the RD-0110 engine powering the Blok I third stage of the Soyuz-U rocket, which caused the onboard computer to terminate the flight through thrust termination. As a result, the vehicle failed to achieve orbit, reentering over the Altai Republic region of Russia. It was the first failure of a Progress spacecraft since launches began in 1978, and the third consecutive orbital launch failure worldwide, following the failures of Ekspress-AM4 and Shijian XI-04 less than a week prior.

As a precaution, the launch of a GLONASS satellite on a Soyuz-2.1b/Fregat, which had been scheduled for 26 August 2011, was delayed until the engines could be inspected.

On 9 September 2011, the FKA announced that the loss was caused by a blocked fuel duct, which caused the engines to shut down prematurely. The failure was not expected to have any immediate effect on the crew of the International Space Station, as the outpost was stocked with reserves of food, water and oxygen. The spacecraft was insured for three billion rubles (US$103 million).

See also 

 2011 in spaceflight
 List of Progress flights
 Uncrewed spaceflights to the International Space Station

References 

Spacecraft launched in 2011
Progress (spacecraft) missions
Satellite launch failures
Spacecraft which reentered in 2011
Spacecraft launched by Soyuz-U rockets
Supply vehicles for the International Space Station
Space accidents and incidents in Kazakhstan